A Place for Us to Dream is a compilation album by the English alternative rock band Placebo. It was released on 7 October 2016, as part of the band's twentieth anniversary celebrations. It consists of 36 tracks, including songs off albums, single versions, radio edits, live performances and redux editions of previously released songs, as well as the 2016 single "Jesus' Son". The compilation includes all Placebo songs that have been released as singles, apart from "Burger Queen Français", "Twenty Years" and "The Never-Ending Why".

"A place for us to dream" is a lyric from the song "Narcoleptic" on Placebo's third album, Black Market Music. The album cover is an iconic photo taken during the 2011 Vancouver Stanley Cup riot.

Release
A Place for Us to Dream was announced on 4 August 2016 on Placebo's official website. The album was released on limited edition deluxe box set pink vinyl, limited edition deluxe box set black vinyl, double CD and digital download.

Track listing

Charts

Certifications

References

2016 greatest hits albums
Placebo (band) albums